John Harry Minney (25 April 1939 – 1 April 2016) was an English cricketer active from 1959 to 1967 who played for Cambridge University and Northamptonshire. He appeared in 19 first-class matches as a righthanded batsman who bowled right arm medium pace. Minney was born in Finedon, Northamptonshire on 25 April 1939, and died in 2016. He scored 572 runs with a highest score of 58.

He made his debut for Northants in the 1961 season, when he played three matches. He returned to the side six years later to play two further games, making his highest score of 58 against Middlesex in his final innings.

Notes

1939 births
2016 deaths
English cricketers
Cambridge University cricketers
Northamptonshire cricketers
People from Finedon